"I Love You" (Korean: 사랑해요) is a ballad song performed by South Korean idol singer Kim Taeyeon, leader and member of the girl group Girls' Generation. The song was the main theme for the 2010 action-drama television series Athena: Goddess of War and the main title track for its sound track album. It was released as a digital single on December 13, 2010, under the record label of S.M. Entertainment.

Production and background

"I Love You" was composed and written by Korean music producer Ahn Youngmin, who is known for producing many ballad songs for various K-pop artists including T-ara, Davichi and SeeYa among others. Kim Taeyeon had collaborated with the producer before on her previous single "Like a Star" for which Minyoung provided the lyrics and singing advice. For "I Love You", Youngmin was not only the lyricist of the song but also handled the composition as well as the music arrangement. He lamented Taeyeon's 'idol star' status and praised her vocal skills by stating that he was "shocked" by her abilities. He went on to remark her prowess that "...[it was] a mature song so I was worried, but she made tears fall down my face... Barely an hour into production had passed, and I remember clapping my hands." The song was used as the main theme song for the love-hate relationship between the lead characters Lee Jung-woo (portrayed by Jung Woo-sung) and Yoon Hye-in (Soo Ae) of the action-drama television series Athena: Goddess of War. According to South Korean music portal site Naver, the song is 'a blend of Irish whistle and a 50-piece orchestra' and that the lyrics talk of the feeling of a woman trying to grab hold of her lover who is breaking up with her, confessing her deep love for him [in process].'

Release
"I Love You" debuted as the ending theme song for Athena: Goddess of War when the show started airing its run on SBS on December 13, 2010. The very same day, the song was released as A-side and B-side single and made available for music download on various music portal sites such as iTunes, Naver, Soribada, Daum, Melon, Olleh, Bugs, Genie and Monkey3. The instrumental version was also included in the single. "I Love You" was the first of the sound tracks featured in the series to be unveiled and released for download. Later, the song was also included as the title track in the original sound track and score album of the series which was also released in physical CD format on February 11, 2011. All releases were marked under the record label of S.M. Entertainment.

Music videos
Two accompanying music videos for "I Love You" were released, though neither were filmed specifically for it and contained only a compilation of various scenes from the television drama series Athena: Goddess of War for which it was also the ending theme song. The first music video was released on December 10, 2010, three days prior to the release of the actual single and first broadcast of the series itself. It was uploaded on the official channel of S.M. Entertainment on YouTube and featured a summary outlook of the entire series that revolved around the tragic love and betrayal relationship between the two lead characters, Lee Jung-woo (portrayed by Jung Woo-sung) and Yoon Hye-in (portrayed by Soo Ae) and their eventual reconciliation. Due to the unexpected popularity that the series and the song itself enjoyed after debut, a second special music video that was titled as the 'SBS Athena highlight video', was aired and uploaded on the same channel on December 16, 2010. The video was different from the previous music video in that it featured various scenes from the series that revolved around the interactions between Lee Jung-woo and his co-worker and Han Jae-hui (portrayed by Lee Ji-ah) and their confused feelings for each other.

Chart performance

Live performances
Kim Taeyeon performed "I Love You" live in front of a combined audience of around 50,000 during concerts at Saitama Super Arena in Tokyo and Osaka-Jo Hall in Osaka on January 5 and 9, 2011 respectively. The Japanese leg of the tour was aimed for the promotion of the television series in Japan which started airing in the country on November 30, 2010. Although her fellow Girls' Generation members were unable to attend due to 'cited' busy schedules, her label-mates BoA, TVXQ, Super Junior and Shinee as well as the cast and crew of the series were present.

Awards and nominations

References

External links 
 "I Love You" at iTunes

2010 singles
SM Entertainment singles
Korean-language songs
Taeyeon songs
2010 songs